John Hubbard may refer to:

Public officials
John Hubbard (Maine politician) (1794–1869), American physician, educator and Democratic legislator
John F. Hubbard (1795–1876), New York politician
John F. Hubbard Jr. (1822–?), New York politician
John Henry Hubbard (1804–1872), American legislator
John Hubbard, 1st Baron Addington (1805–1889), English financier
John Hubbard (admiral) (1849–1932), American naval officer
John Hubbard, 3rd Baron Addington (1883–1966), English legislator and administrator

Scholars
John R. Hubbard (1918–2011), American educator, historian and diplomat
John Hubbard (physicist) (1931–1980), English physicist
John H. Hubbard (born 1945), American mathematician and educator

Team sports competitors
John H. "Jack" Hubbard (1886–1978), American college football player
Johnny Hubbard (1930–2018), South African footballer
John Philip Hubbard (born 1949), English footballer

Others
John Hubbard (convict) (1839–after 1888), British clerk convicted of forgery and deported to Western Australia in 1865
John Hubbard (actor) (1914–1988), American actor
John Hubbard (artist) (1931–2017), American painter

See also
Hubbard (surname)
Jon Hubbard, American politician